Aykroyd is an English surname.  Notable people with the surname include:

 Dan Aykroyd (born 1952), Canadian comedian, actor, screenwriter and musician; brother of Peter
 James P. Aykroyd (1810−1835), early American composer, music teacher, musician
 Peter Aykroyd (1955−2021), Canadian comedian, actor, screenwriter and musician; brother of Dan
 William Aykroyd, 1st Baronet OStJ (1865−1947), English woollen and carpet manufacturer

See also
 Aykroyd Baronets
 Ackroyd
 Akroyd

English-language surnames